The Associates is a Canadian television drama series that aired on CTV in 2001 and 2002. The show centred on the professional and personal lives of five junior associate lawyers at the Toronto office of the multinational law firm of Young, Barnsworth & King.

The show's cast included Demore Barnes as Benjamin Hardaway, Shaun Benson as Jonah Gleason, Tamara Hickey as Robyn Parsons, Gabriel Hogan as Mitch Barnsworth and Jennie Raymond as Amy Kassan, as well as R.H. Thomson as Angus MacGregor, the firm's senior partner, and Sean Sullivan as Dale Friesen, the associates' supervising partner. The show also sometimes made differences between Canadian and American law into plot points, notably by writing both Robyn Parsons and Benjamin Hardaway as American transplants who sometimes ran into trouble because of their greater familiarity with U.S. courtroom procedure.

The series was co-created by Greg Ball and Steve Blackman, themselves former associates at a law firm in Edmonton who based it on some of their own experiences.

The show was successful in its first two years of ratings, but due to tax cutbacks from the government, the show could not continue into a third season.

Critical response
John Doyle of The Globe and Mail panned the first episode, but wrote that the series improved significantly thereafter. He criticized Hogan's performance as Mitch, writing that "his accent wobbles and wanders all over the United Kingdom and Ireland and he looks nothing like anyone's picture of an upper-class, well-connected Brit lawyer. Instead he looks like the younger sibling of one of the Gallagher brothers from Oasis, with a bad, blond dye job." He opined that the show's real saving grace was Hickey's portrayal of Robyn, whose brashness in the first episode was gradually revealed as a front for insecurity and shyness, making her the show's most relatable character and grounding it the same way Patrick McKenna's Marty had served as the "everyman" anchor in Traders.

Dan Brown of the National Post criticized the characters of Benjamin Hardaway and Amy Kassan as unsympathetic, writing that Barnes played Benjamin like he was auditioning for the role of Tuvok in Star Trek: Voyager.

Tony Atherton of the Ottawa Citizen similarly wrote that the first episode was weak, but that the series improved over the course of the season.

Awards

Episodes

Season one

Season two

References

External links

2000s Canadian drama television series
CTV Television Network original programming
2001 Canadian television series debuts
2002 Canadian television series endings
Television shows set in Toronto